Park police are a type of security police who function as a full-service law enforcement agency with responsibilities and jurisdiction in park areas primarily located in cities and other urban areas. In addition to performing the normal crime prevention, investigation, and apprehension functions of a municipal police force, the park police may be responsible for policing other public areas and may also share law enforcement jurisdiction with a force of park rangers tasked with the same law enforcement powers and responsibilities.

List of park police/ranger forces

Canada
 Niagara Parks Police
 Parks Canada Warden

Indonesia
 Indonesian Forest Rangers

Italy
 Corpo Forestale dello Stato (defunct, functions absorbed by Carabinieri)

United States
 United States Park Police
 New Jersey State Park Police
 California State Park Rangers (California State Park Peace Officers)
 Lafayette Park Police (Louisiana)
 New York State Park Police
 New York State Department of Environmental Conservation Police
 New York City Parks Enforcement Patrol 
 Maryland-National Capital Park Police
 Morris County (NJ) Park Police
 Delaware County (PA) Bureau of Park Police & Fire Safety
 Minneapolis Park Police (Minnesota)

United Kingdom
 Parks police in the United Kingdom

See also 
 List of protective service agencies
 Federal police

References

Law enforcement units
Police